Mohammed Rabiul Hasan is a Bangladeshi footballer who plays as a midfielder. He currently plays for Police Football Club in Bangladesh Premier League.

Club career

Mohammedan SC
Robiul joined Dhaka Mohammedan in 2020. Mohammedan announced in July 2021, that the club had expelled Robiul indefinitely for disciplinary issues. Although Robiul was still a Mohammedan player on paper, there was no communication between him and the club.

International career
On 29 August 2018, Hasan made his senior career debut against Sri Lanka during an international friendly.

International goals
Scores and results list Bangladesh U23's goal tally first.

Scores and results list Bangladesh's goal tally first.

References

1999 births
Living people
Bangladeshi footballers
Bangladesh international footballers
Bangladesh Football Premier League players
Association football midfielders
Arambagh KS players
Abahani Limited (Chittagong) players
Bashundhara Kings players